is a top-down, vertically scrolling shooter developed by Crux and released in arcades by Taito in 1984. Ports to the Nintendo Entertainment System / Famicom and MSX followed. The player flies a helicopter that can shoot air and ground targets.

Gameplay

Reception 
In Japan, Game Machine listed Gyrodine on their August 1, 1984 issue as being the ninth most-successful table arcade unit of the month.

References

External links

1984 video games
Arcade video games
Helicopter video games
Human Entertainment games
Nintendo Entertainment System games
MSX games
NEC PC-8801 games
Sharp X1 games
Vertically scrolling shooters
Taito arcade games
Video games developed in Japan